Mount Saint Canice was a Catholic convent first opened in Hobart, Tasmania, Australia by the Good Shepherd Sisters in 1893. The sisters began to take in young women who were perceived to have fallen short of the morals and values of the times. The Mount Saint Canice convent was to become known as The Magdalene Laundry and was one of ten such laundries in operation throughout Australia. They were based on existing Magdalene laundries in Ireland.  "The Magdalene Laundries were workhouses in which many Irish women and girls were effectively imprisoned because they were perceived to be a threat to the moral fiber of society."

The convent closed after 8 were killed in an explosion in 1974.

History
Mount Saint Canice has been likened by former inmates to laundries which operated in Ireland.  Former inmates of Mount Saint Canice are now referred to as  Forgotten Australians.  In 2009, an official Australian government apology was made to people who had grown up in the institutional system, including former child immigrants to Australia. The apology was made by the Australian Prime Minister Kevin Rudd.

Survivor and artist Rachael Romero represents her experience as a girl in a similar Convent of the Good Shepherd in South Australia and another of the commercial laundries known collectively around the world as "Magdalene Laundries."  Romero's art portrays her experience in the convent, recalling her suffering as an inmate.  She expresses her opinion about the Good Shepherd nun's 150th anniversary celebration.

Writer and author Merlene Fawdry gives insight into the daily operation of Mount Saint Canice in "My Magdalene Home."

Janice Konstantinidis, guest author for the Australian National Museum, 28 February 2011, shares a current photograph, as well as her detailed history of her time from the age of 12 working in the Magdalene laundry of Mount Saint Canice, nicknamed "The Mag."  Janice also includes recollections of the lengths some girls would go to in order to escape.

Mount Saint Canice had similar conditions to those shown in the 2002 film The Magdalene Sisters, written and directed by Peter Mullan. Girls as young as eleven were turned over to the Good Shepherd sisters.  While there was a school at Mount Saint Canice, the curriculum was very basic.  These younger girls were also forced to work in the laundry.  Many young women who came to Mount Saint Canice pregnant were forced to give up their babies for adoption.  Most women were released after varying lengths of stay; however, some stayed all their lives.

The Good Shepherd mother convent in Australia was Abbotsford, a commercial laundry that provided (unpaid) employment for girls and women and generated income for the Convent (1863 - 1975).  The Convent was able to care for up to 1,000 and was self-sufficient through its farming, Industrial School and laundry activities.

Other Good Shepherd convents in Australia that supported themselves as industrial laundries included:   
 Leederville, Perth, Western Australia, begun in 1903. A commercial laundry.
 St Aiden's, Albert Park Convent - on Port Phillip Bay, Bendigo, Victoria, first opened as a Melbourne Convent. The commercial laundry generated income for the Convent.
 Ashfield, Sydney during 1913 expanded to Toongabbie (1948 - 1961). Laundry.
 Mitchelton, Queensland 1931, industrial laundry.
 Albert Park, South Melbourne, 1892 - 1974.  Industrial laundry.    
 "The Pines", North Plympton, South Australia (1941 - 1974) a commercial laundry provided (unpaid) employment and generated income for the convent, under the control of the Good Shepherd Sisters and the Children's Welfare and Public Relief Board and its successors.,     
 Oakleigh, 1883 - a reformatory school for adolescents in Southeast Melbourne, Victoria.

Historian Adele Chynoweth writes about the  Good Shepherd Sisters denying history: There are no precise figures for the number of girls who slaved in the ten Magdalene laundries run by the Good Shepherd Sisters in twentieth century Australia. This is because the order of the Good Shepherd Sisters has not released its records.  We do know, as a result of the Federal Senate Report on Forgotten Australians (2004) that the Good Shepherd laundries in Australia acted as prisons for the girls who were forced to labor in workhouses laundering linen for local hospitals or commercial premises. The report also described the conditions as characterized by inedible food, unhygienic living conditions and little or no education.  In 2008, in Federal Parliament, Senator Andrew Murray likened the Convent of the Good Shepherd, "The Pines," Adelaide,  to a prisoner-of-war camp.

Good Shepherd Australia's Province Leader, Sister Anne Manning writes: "We acknowledge, that for numbers of women, memories of their time with Good Shepherd are painful. We are deeply sorry for acts of verbal or physical cruelty that occurred: such things should never have taken place in a Good Shepherd facility. The understanding that we have been the cause of suffering is our deep regret as we look back over our history."

Mount Saint Canice closed after a tragic fire as a result of a boiler explosion in 1974. The buildings are now occupied by a retirement complex, the Saint Canice Lifestyle Village.

State government funded redress schemes have made or are planning ex-gratia payments to Forgotten Australians in some states.

References

External links
 Page for survivors of the Magdalene Laundries Survivors artwork, Australian laundries
 Magdalene laundries in Ireland.
 Life in the Mag
 Justice for Magdalenes, advocacy group for survivors of Magdalene Laundries (Ireland)
 The Magdalene Laundry. CBS News, 3 August 2003.
 Review of Academic study of prostitution reform

Further reading
  Chynoweth, Adele, PhD, "The stain is indelible: Rachael Romero’s The Magdalene Diaries" by Adele Chynoweth PhD published in: n. paradoxa: Volume 32, July 2013: international feminist art journal on Citizenship. n.paradoxa in print:  –ktpress.uk
  Croll, Rie (2019), Shaped by Silence, PO Box 4200, St. John's Newfoundland, Canada, ISER Books, Memorial University Press, ISBN 978-1-894725-53-8.
  Franklin, James, "Convent slave laundries? Magdalen asylums in Australia", Journal of the Australian Catholic Historical Society 34 (2013), 70-90.
  Konstantinidis, Janice, "Life in 'The Mag'", "Journal of the Australian Catholic Historical Society Volume 34" (2013), 91-102. 
  McCarthy, Rebecca Lea, "Origins of the Magdalene Laundries An Analytical History "(2008). Print . Ebook 
  Smith, James M, "Ireland's Magdalen Laundries and the Nation's architecture of containment." Manchester: Manchester University Press. .

Religious buildings and structures in Tasmania
Convents in Australia